Wagaung; formerly Nanka is the fifth month of the traditional Burmese calendar.

Festivals and observances
Taungbyone Nat Festival
Maha Dok Festival

Wagaung symbols
Flower: Crinum amoenum

References

See also
Burmese calendar
Festivals of Burma
Vassa

Months of the Burmese calendar